Church of St. John's almshouse is a wooden church in Tallinn, Estonia. Since 1999 the building is designated as "architectural monument".

Nowadays, the church is used by a congregation belonging to Armenian Apostolic Church.

The building's history dates back to the beginning of 13th century. Originally the building was a stone church and the building was named as John's hospital, later it was named to John's almshouse church. Historically, the building was also used as a leprosarium. In 1813 the hospital was officially named to almshouse.

References

External links

Churches in Tallinn